Daniel Gray "Dan" Quillen (June 22, 1940 – April 30, 2011) was an American mathematician. He is known for being the "prime architect" of higher algebraic K-theory, for which he was awarded the Cole Prize in 1975 and the Fields Medal in 1978.

From 1984 to 2006, he was the Waynflete Professor of Pure Mathematics at Magdalen College, Oxford.

Education and career
Quillen was born in Orange, New Jersey, and attended Newark Academy. He entered Harvard University, where he earned both his AB, in 1961, and his PhD in 1964; the latter completed under the supervision of Raoul Bott, with a thesis in partial differential equations. He was a Putnam Fellow in 1959.

Quillen obtained a position at the Massachusetts Institute of Technology after completing his doctorate. He also spent a number of years at several other universities. He visited France twice: first as a Sloan Fellow in Paris, during the academic year 1968–69, where he was greatly influenced by Grothendieck, and then, during 1973–74, as a Guggenheim Fellow. In 1969–70, he was a visiting member of the Institute for Advanced Study in Princeton, where he came under the influence of Michael Atiyah.

In 1978, Quillen received a Fields Medal at the International Congress of Mathematicians held in Helsinki.

From 1984 to 2006, he was the Waynflete Professor of Pure Mathematics at Magdalen College, Oxford.

Quillen retired at the end of 2006. He died from complications of Alzheimer's disease on April 30,
2011, aged 70, in Florida.

Mathematical contributions
Quillen's best known contribution (mentioned specifically in his Fields medal citation) was his formulation of higher algebraic K-theory in 1972. This new tool, formulated in terms of homotopy theory, proved to be successful in formulating and solving problems in algebra, particularly in ring theory and module theory.  More generally, Quillen developed tools (especially his theory of model categories) that allowed algebro-topological tools to be applied in other contexts.

Before his work in defining higher algebraic K-theory, Quillen worked on the Adams conjecture, formulated by Frank Adams, in homotopy theory.  His proof of the conjecture used techniques from the modular representation theory of groups, which he later applied to work on cohomology of groups and algebraic K-theory. He also worked on complex cobordism, showing that its formal group law is essentially the universal one.

In related work, he also supplied a proof of Serre's conjecture about the triviality of algebraic vector bundles on affine space, which led to the Bass–Quillen conjecture. He was also an architect (along with Dennis Sullivan) of rational homotopy theory.

He introduced the Quillen determinant line bundle and the Mathai–Quillen formalism.

See also
 Friedhelm Waldhausen

Selected publications

 
 
 
 
 
 
 
 
  (Quillen's Q-construction)

References

External links 
 Archive of Daniel Quillen’s notebooks for the years 1970 through 2003 at the Clay Mathematics Institute
 
 
 

1940 births
2011 deaths
20th-century American mathematicians
21st-century American mathematicians
Deaths from dementia in Florida
Deaths from Alzheimer's disease
Members of the United States National Academy of Sciences
Fields Medalists
Putnam Fellows
Algebraists
Topologists
Institute for Advanced Study visiting scholars
Harvard University alumni
People from Orange, New Jersey
Waynflete Professors of Pure Mathematics
Fellows of Magdalen College, Oxford
Mathematicians from New Jersey
Massachusetts Institute of Technology School of Science faculty
Newark Academy alumni